Galmi Hospital is a 184-bed mission hospital administered by SIM (Serving In Mission) in the Nigerien village of Galmi. Galmi Hospital is staffed by doctors and nurses from all over the world, as well as locally trained medical personnel. Patients travel from surrounding villages and countries to receive medical attention.  The hospital also has a working HIV Program as well as Nutritional Rehabilitation.

References

External links
 

Hospitals with year of establishment missing
Hospitals in Niger